A stigma, also called macula pellucida, in mammalian reproductive anatomy, refers to the area of the ovarian surface where the Graafian follicle will burst through during ovulation and release the ovum.
As the follicle matures, the area between the follicle and the ovarian surface begins to thin and weaken under the influence of the luteinizing hormone and local cytokines. At ovulation the stigma ruptures and the secondary oocyte is released along with surrounding granulosa cells, from the region of the cumulus oophorus, and follicular fluid. The secondary oocyte needs to be captured by the fallopian tube where it could be fertilized by a sperm cell. The stigma will heal and the residual follicle is transformed into the corpus luteum.

References

Animal developmental biology
Embryology

simple:Stigma (anatomy)